CC, for "CopyCat" or "Carbon Copy" (December 22, 2001 – March 3, 2020), was a brown tabby and white domestic shorthair and the first cloned pet. She was cloned by scientists at Texas A&M University in conjunction with Genetic Savings & Clone Inc. CC's surrogate mother was a tabby, but her genetic donor, Rainbow, was a calico domestic shorthair. The difference in hair coloration between CC and Rainbow is due to X-inactivation and epigenetic re-programming, which normally occurs in a fertilized embryo before implantation.

In September 2006, CC gave birth to four kittens. The litter was fathered naturally by another lab cat named Smokey. It included two males named Tim and Zip and one female named Tess. Another kitten (a female) was stillborn. This incident was the first time a cloned pet gave birth. Throughout her life, CC appeared to be free of the cloning-related health problems that have arisen in some other animal clones. "CC has always been a perfectly normal cat and her kittens are just that way, too," according to Shirley Kraemer, CC's owner. "We've been monitoring their health and all of them are fine, just like CC has been for the past five years."

In 2004, Genetic Savings and Clone produced the first commercially cloned pet, a Maine Coon cat named "Little Nicky" who was cloned from a 17-year-old deceased pet cat.

On March 3, 2020, CC died at 18 in College Station, Texas.

See also
 Little Nicky (cat)
 Pet cloning
 List of individual cats

References

External links 
 Grown: Rainbow (left) and daughter
 Copy Cat now has three kittens, September 2006
 Meet CC!
 Rainbow & CC

2001 in science
Cloned cats
2001 animal births
2020 animal deaths